The 2002–03 Southern Football League season was the 100th in the history of the league, an English football competition.

Tamworth won the Premier Division and earned promotion to the Football Conference for the first time. Halesowen Town, Hastings United, Ilkeston Town and Folkestone Invicta were relegated from the Premier Division, whilst Dorchester Town, Merthyr Tydfil, Eastbourne Borough and Weston-super-Mare were promoted from the Eastern and Western Divisions, the former two as champions. Spalding United, St Leonards, Rocester and Racing Club Warwick were all relegated to the eighth level.

Premier Division
The Premier Division consisted of 22 clubs, including 17 clubs from the previous season and five new clubs:
Two clubs promoted from the Eastern Division:
Hastings Town, who also changed name to Hastings United
Grantham Town

Two clubs promoted from the Western Division:
Chippenham Town
Halesowen Town

Plus:
Dover Athletic, relegated from the Football Conference

League table

Eastern Division
The Eastern Division consisted of 22 clubs, including 18 clubs from the previous season and four new clubs:
Three clubs relegated from the Premier Division:
King's Lynn
Newport (Isle of Wight)
Salisbury City

Plus:
Fleet Town, promoted from the Wessex League

League table

Western Division
The Western Division consisted of 22 clubs, including 18 clubs from the previous season and four new clubs:
Bromsgrove Rovers, promoted from the Midland Alliance
Merthyr Tydfil, relegated from the Premier Division
Rugby United, transferred from the Eastern Division
Taunton Town, promoted from the Western League

League table

See also
Southern Football League
2002–03 Isthmian League
2002–03 Northern Premier League

References

Southern Football League seasons
6